The Charleston Southern Buccaneers women's basketball team is a basketball team that represents Charleston Southern University in North Charleston, South Carolina, United States.  The school's team currently competes in the Big South Conference.

History
Charleston Southern began play in 1976. They joined the Big South Conference in 2000. They competed in the 2012 Women's Basketball Invitational, their first ever postseason appearance. They were beaten 80-51 by Minnesota in the First Round. As of the end of the 2015-16 season, the Buccaneers have an all-time record of 324-718.

Postseason
Charleston Southern has made one appearance in the Women's Basketball Invitational. They have a record of 0-1.

References

External links